Robert Cazala (7 January 1934 – 18 February 2023) was a French cyclist. He became professional in 1958, and stayed with the same team Mercier-BP-Hutchinson until he retired in 1968. During his career, he had 36 professional victories. He participated in 8 Tours de France, won four stages and wore the yellow jersey for six days.

Cazala died on 18 February 2023, at the age of 89.

Major results

1958
Stage 8 Dauphiné Libéré.
Prix de Bergerac
Prix de Sigoules.
1959
Winner Tour de Champagne
Winner 5th stage
Tour de France: 32nd place
winner 3rd stage
six days in yellow jersey
Winner stage 3b in Grand Prix du Midi Libre
Prix de Puy-l'Evêque.
1960
Tour de France: not finished
Winner Tour de Champagne
Winner 2nd stage
Winner stage 6 Dauphiné Libéré
Winner stage 2 Midi-Libre
Winner stage 4 Tour du Sud-Est
Prix de Royan
Prix d'Alger
Prix de Brioude.
1961
Winner Tour du Var
Winner 1st stage Tour du Var
Tour de France: 40th place
Winner 21st stage
Winner stages 2 and 4 Midi-Libre
Prix de Morlaix.
1962
Tour de France: 22nd place
Winner stages 6 and 12
Winner stage 5 Tour du Sud-Est
Ronde de Seignelay
Prix de Plounavez.
1963
Tour de France: 30th place
Prix d'Eymoutiers
Prix de Lubersac
Prix de Saint-Macaud.
1964
Tour de France: 59th place
Winner stage 1 Midi-Libre
Prix de Saint-Hilaire
Prix de Maurs.
1965
Tour de France: 64th place
Grand Prix de la Trinité
Prix de Saint-Alvèze.
1966
Tour de France: 80th place
Grand Prix d'Espéraza.

References

External links
Palmares on pyrenees-passion.info 
Palmares on france-cyclisme.com 
Palmares on memoire-du-cyclisme.net 
Cazala's results in the Tour de France 

1934 births
2023 deaths
Sportspeople from Pyrénées-Atlantiques
French male cyclists
French Tour de France stage winners
Cyclists from Nouvelle-Aquitaine